Världen snurrar is a 2012 Lena Philipsson studio album.

Track listing
"Du följer väl med?" – 3:46
"Live Tomorrow" – 3:09
"Blir galen" – 4:22
"Idiot" – 3:34
"Vart tog du vägen?" – 3:37
"Igen och igen" – 3:51
"Världen snurrar" – 3:51
"Ett hjärta" – 3:13
"The botten is nådd" – 3:48
"Nästa säsong" – 3:16

Charts

References 

2012 albums
Lena Philipsson albums